Abobra is a monotypic genus of the gourd family containing the one species Abobra tenuifolia (syn. Abobra viridiflora Naudin, Bryonia tenuifolia Hook. & Arn.). It is a diecious, perennial climbing plant reaching up to 4 meters height native to South America (Argentinia, Brasil, and Uruguay) and sometimes cultivated as ornamental plants and also for its edible fruits. The flowers exude a strong fragrance and are of pale green color and blossom between July and August. The seeds ripen between September and October. The fruit is ovoid and has a diameter of 14 mm. Common names include cranberry gourd.

References

External links
Plants For A Future: Abobra tenuifolia

Flora of Brazil
Monotypic Cucurbitaceae genera
Cucurbitoideae